The San Marcos Daily Record is five-day daily newspaper published in San Marcos, Texas, in the morning on weekdays (Tuesday through Friday), and Sunday. It is owned by Moser Community Media, LLC.
The Record absorbed the Hays County Citizen on July 6, 1978. The paper also publishes a 1,500-circulation Wednesday weekly newspaper, the Hill Country Record.

The Daily Record reported an average paid circulation of 2,980 in 2011, the most recent year for which figures were available.

References

External links
 San Marcos Daily Record Website

Daily newspapers published in Texas
Hays County, Texas